C-size may refer to:

 C series in paper size
 C cup size in bra sizes
 C battery

See also
 Cizer, in Sălaj County, Romania
 sizeof function in C and C++ programming language
 C series (disambiguation)